Gustaf Ljunggren (6 February 1893 – 12 December 1984) was a Swedish athlete. He competed in the men's standing long jump at the 1912 Summer Olympics.

References

External links
 

1893 births
1984 deaths
Athletes (track and field) at the 1912 Summer Olympics
Swedish male long jumpers
Olympic athletes of Sweden
Athletes from Gothenburg